The 2022–23 Wisła Kraków season is the 7th season in the I liga and the 69th season in the Polish Cup.

Transfers

Summer transfer window

Arrivals 
 The following players moved to Wisła.

Departures
 The following players moved from Wisła.

Winter transfer window

Arrivals 
 The following players moved to Wisła.

Departures
 The following players moved from Wisła.

Competitions

Preseason and friendlies

I liga

League table

Results summary

Results by round

Matches

Polish Cup

Squad and statistics

Appearances, goals and discipline

Goalscorers

Disciplinary record
{|class="wikitable sortable" style="text-align: center;"
|-
!rowspan=2 style="background:#DD0000; color:white"| 
!rowspan=2 style="background:#DD0000; color:white"| 
!rowspan=2 style="background:#DD0000; color:white"| 
!rowspan=2 style="background:#DD0000; color:white"| Name
!colspan=3 style="background:#DD0000; color:white"| I liga
!colspan=3 style="background:#DD0000; color:white"| Polish Cup
!colspan=3 style="background:#DD0000; color:white"| Total
|rowspan=2 style="background:#DD0000; color:white"| Notes
|-
!width=30 |
!width=30 |
!width=30 |
!width=30 |
!width=30 |
!width=30 |
!width=30 |
!width=30 |
!width=30 |
|-

References

Wisła Kraków seasons
Wisla Krakow